Robin van Roosmalen (born 1 October 1989) is a retired Dutch kickboxer and mixed martial artist, currently signed with Bellator MMA, competing in their Featherweight division. He is the former Glory Featherweight Champion and former Glory Lightweight Champion. 

As of 1 November 2018, he is ranked the #5 featherweight in the world by Combat Press.

Biography
Van Roosmalen is the oldest of three children. His father, William van Roosmalen, is a former world champion in Muay Thai and kickboxing, together with Pelé Reid, the only men to ever knock out Vitali Klitschko in a kickboxing bout (WAKO European finals, Kiev, 1995) and also the only man to knock out William Beekwilder. Growing up in a kickboxing family, Van Roosmalen began training at the age of 3 under his father in his gym and later also began boxing, wrestling, mixed martial arts and judo, in which he received a black belt. He is known for his aggressive, high paced fighting style.

Kickboxing career
Van Roosmalen made it to the semi-finals of the K-1 World MAX West Europe Tournament by beating Henri van Opstal in the quarter-final. He lost his semi-final bout against the eventual winner Mohammed Khamal by KO. After losing a fight against Ajay Balgobind, Van Roosmalen rebounded by knocking out Dutch slugger William Diender with a liver punch and beating the highly regarded Dutch-Moroccan Chahid Oulad El Hadj by decision. On 21 May 2011, Van Roosmalen met Mohammed Khamal in a rematch in Amsterdam. He lost the match by judges' decision.

On 25 September 2011, van Roosmalen won the It's Showtime "Fast & Furious 70MAX" title in Brussels. He beat Chahid Oulad El Hadj for the 2nd time by TKO in the second round, Chris Ngimbi by decision and Artur Kyshenko by KO in the first round. Van Roosmalen had entered the tournament as a replacement for 70MAX giant Giorgio Petrosyan, who had injured himself in his fight against Hinata, and was seen as an underdog to win the tournament over the more highly ranked and experienced Artur Kyshenko.

Glory 
Van Roosmalen was drawn against Tim Thomas in the quarter-finals of the Glory 3: Rome - 2012 Middleweight Slam Final 8 on 3 November 2012, in Rome, Italy, and won by TKO in the second round when he battered the Englishman into a referee stoppage. In the semis, he dropped Sanny Dahlbeck in each of the first two rounds before finishing him with a punch to the body in the third. Advancing to the final, he went up against Giorgio Petrosyan. His aggressive style played into Petrosyan's hands, however, and he was outclassed by the silky Italian to a unanimous decision loss.

Van Roosmalen took a dominant unanimous decision over Yuichiro Nagashima at Glory 4: Tokyo - 2012 Heavyweight Grand Slam in Saitama, Japan on 31 December 2012, dropping "Jienotsu" in round one and scoring with low kicks and hard punches throughout. He dropped Murthel Groenhart in round one en route to a unanimous decision win at Glory 7: Milan in Milan, Italy on 20 April 2013. He beat Shemsi Beqiri by unanimous decision in a back-and-forth fight at Glory 10: Los Angeles - Middleweight World Championship Tournament in Ontario, California, United States, on 28 September 2013.

Van Roosmalen rematched Davit Kiria in the semi-finals of the Glory 12: New York - Lightweight World Championship Tournament in New York City, New York, US on 23 November 2013, winning a unanimous decision. In the final, he was battered by Andy Ristie, getting dropped in round one before being knocked out in two. He defeated Marat Grigorian via split decision in the co-main event of Glory 15: Istanbul in Istanbul, Turkey on 12 April 2014.

Lightweight champion 
Van Roosmalen captured the Glory lightweight title with a majority decision win over Davit Kiria at Glory 18: Oklahoma on 7 November 2014. He rematched Andy Ristie at Glory 20: Dubai and retained his lightweight title with a dominant unanimous decision win after knocking Ristie down two times in the fourth round. All three judges scored the fight 49-44 in favor of van Roosmalen. On 11 May 2015, he was ranked as the #1 lightweight in the world by LiverKick.com. He defended his title a second time, this time a unanimous decision against Sitthichai Sitsongpeenong at Glory 25: Milan. However, he would lose the title via split decision in a rematch against Sitsongpeenong at Glory 31: Amsterdam.

Featherweight champion 
After losing his lightweight title, Van Roosmalen dropped down to featherweight and immediately faced Gabriel Varga for the Canadian's featherweight title. Van Roosmalen dropped Varga twice in the second round and dominated the Canadian throughout the fight, prompting the featherweight champion's corner to throw in the towel in the break between the fourth and fifth round. With this win, Van Roosmalen became the first fighter to hold a Glory title in two separate weight classes. On 29 September 2018, at Glory 59, Robin van Roosmalen was defeated by the #1 challenger and Interim champion Petchpanomrung "The Professor" Kiatmookao via unanimous decision (50-45, 50-45, 50-45, 50-45, 50-45).

Mixed martial arts career

Final Fight Championship
In February 2016, van Roosmalen made his professional mixed martial arts debut for Final Fight Championship. He made his debut against Theo Michailidis at FFC 22, and he won the fight via second round knockout. His next bout came on 11 March 2017 at FFC 28 against Risto Dimitrov, and he was victorious via first round technical knockout. On 13 December 2018, Van Roosmalen announced that he would transitioning from kickboxing to MMA full-time.

Bellator MMA
On 28 May 2019, Bellator MMA president Scott Coker announced via Twitter that he signed Van Roosmalen to a multi-fight contract. Van Roosmalen was expected to make his promotional debut in a featherweight bout against Cris Lencioni at Bellator 232 on 26 October 2019. However, Van Roosmalen missed the featherweight limit by nine pounds and the bout was cancelled, with the athletic commission stating Van Roosmalen must compete at Lightweight from now on.

Personal life
On 13 January 2021, Van Roosmalen and his younger sister were involved in a car accident in their home country of the Netherlands. Robin was hospitalized with numerous injuries and his sister was pronounced dead as a result of the injuries she suffered. No further details on van Roosmalen's physical condition have been revealed to the public.

Championships & accomplishments
Glory
Glory Featherweight Champion (two times)
Glory Lightweight Champion (one time)
Two successful title defenses 
2013 Glory Lightweight World Championship Tournament Runner-up
2012 Glory 70kg Slam Tournament Runner-up
It's Showtime
It's Showtime "Fast & Furious 70MAX" Tournament Champion

Mixed martial arts record

|-
|Win
|align=center|2–0
|Risto Dimitrov
|TKO (punches)
|FFC 28
|
|align=center|1
|align=center|2:56
|Athens, Greece
|
|-
|Win
|align=center|1–0
|Theo Michailidis
|KO (punch)
|FFC 22
|
|align=center|2
|align=center|2:21
|Athens, Greece
|
|-

Kickboxing record

|- 
|-  style="background:#fbb;"
| 2018-09-29 || Loss ||align=left| Petpanomrung Kiatmuu9 || Glory 59: Amsterdam || Amsterdam, Netherlands || Decision (Unanimous) || 5 || 3:00 
|-
!  style=background:white colspan=9 |
|-
|-  style="background:#cfc;"
| 2018-03-31 || Win ||align=left| Kevin VanNostrand || Glory 52: Los Angeles || Los Angeles, United States || Decision (Unanimous) || 5 || 3:00 
|-
!  style=background:white colspan=9 |
|- 
|-  style="background:#cfc;"
| 2017-09-30 || Win ||align=left| Serhiy Adamchuk || Glory 45: Amsterdam || Amsterdam, Netherlands || Decision (Unanimous) || 5 || 3:00 
|-
!  style=background:white colspan=9 |
|-  style="background:#cfc;"
| 2017-05-20 || Win ||align=left| Petpanomrung Kiatmuu9 || Glory 41: Holland || Den Bosch, Netherlands || Decision (majority) || 5 || 3:00 
|-
! style=background:white colspan=9 | 
|-  style="background:#cfc;"
| 2017-01-20 || Win ||align=left| Matt Embree || Glory 37: Los Angeles || Los Angeles, California, US || TKO (Referee Stoppage/Punches) || 4 || 2:00 
|-
! style=background:white colspan=9 | 
|-  style="background:#cfc;"
| 2016-10-21 || Win ||align=left| Gabriel Varga || Glory 34: Denver || Broomfield, Colorado, US || TKO (corner stoppage) || 4  || 3:00 
|-
! style=background:white colspan=9 | 
|-  style="background:#fbb;"
| 2016-06-25 || Loss ||align=left| Sitthichai Sitsongpeenong || Glory 31: Amsterdam || Amsterdam, Netherlands || Decision (Split) || 5 || 3:00 
|-
! style=background:white colspan=9 | 
|-  style="background:#cfc;"
| 2015-11-06 || Win ||align=left| Sitthichai Sitsongpeenong || Glory 25: Milan || Monza, Italy || Decision (unanimous) || 5  || 3:00 
|-
! style=background:white colspan=9 | 
|-  style="background:#cfc;"
| 2015-06-03 || Win ||align=left| Steve Moxon || Friday Night Fights ‘FIGHT FOR EDUCATION’ || New York, US || Decision(Unanimous) || 3 || 3:00 
|-  style="background:#cfc;"
| 2015-04-03 || Win ||align=left| Andy Ristie || Glory 20: Dubai || Dubai, UAE || Decision (unanimous) || 5 || 3:00 
|-
! style=background:white colspan=9 | 
|-  style="background:#cfc;"
| 2014-11-07 || Win ||align=left| Davit Kiria || Glory 18: Oklahoma || Oklahoma City, Oklahoma, US || Decision (majority) || 5 || 3:00 
|-
! style=background:white colspan=9 | 
|-  style="background:#cfc;"
| 2014-04-12 || Win ||align=left| Marat Grigorian || Glory 15: Istanbul || Istanbul, Turkey || Decision (split) || 3 || 3:00 
|-  style="background:#fbb;"
| 2013-11-23 || Loss ||align=left| Andy Ristie || Glory 12: New York || New York City, New York, US || KO (left uppercut) || 2 || 1:45 
|-
! style=background:white colspan=9 |
|-  style="background:#cfc;"
| 2013-11-23 || Win ||align=left| Davit Kiria || Glory 12: New York || New York City, New York, US || Decision (unanimous) || 3 || 3:00 
|-
! style=background:white colspan=9 |
|-  style="background:#cfc;"
| 2013-09-28 || Win ||align=left| Shemsi Beqiri || Glory 10: Los Angeles || Ontario, California, US || Decision (unanimous) || 3 || 3:00 
|-  style="background:#cfc;"
| 2013-04-20 || Win ||align=left| Murthel Groenhart || Glory 7: Milan || Milan, Italy || Decision (unanimous) || 3 || 3:00 
|-  style="background:#cfc;"
| 2012-12-31 || Win ||align=left| Yuichiro Nagashima || Glory 4: Tokyo || Saitama, Japan || Decision (unanimous) || 3 || 3:00 
|-  style="background:#fbb;"
| 2012-11-03 || Loss ||align=left| Giorgio Petrosyan || Glory 3: Rome || Rome, Italy || Decision (unanimous) || 3 || 3:00 
|-
! style=background:white colspan=9 |
|-  style="background:#cfc;"
| 2012-11-03 || Win ||align=left| Sanny Dahlbeck || Glory 3: Rome || Rome, Italy || TKO (punch to the body) || 3 || 
|-
! style=background:white colspan=9 |
|-  style="background:#cfc;"
| 2012-11-03 || Win ||align=left| Tim Thomas || Glory 3: Rome || Rome, Italy || TKO (referee stoppage) || 2 || 1:05 
|-
! style=background:white colspan=9 |
|-  style="background:#fbb;"
| 2012-06-30 || Loss  ||align=left| Hafid el Boustati || It's Showtime || Brussels, Belgium || TKO(Doctor Stoppage/Cut from knee) || 2 || 2:00 
|-  style="background:#cfc;"
| 2012-05-26 || Win ||align=left| Dzhabar Askerov || Glory 1: Stockholm || Stockholm, Sweden || Decision (Unanimous) || 3 || 3:00 
|-
! style=background:white colspan=9 |
|-  style="background:#cfc;"
| 2012-02-26 || Win  ||align=left| Rachid Belaini || Vuisten Van Vuur || 's-Hertogenbosch, Netherlands || Decision (Unanimous) || 3 || 3.00 
|-  style="background:#cfc;"
| 2012-01-28 || Win ||align=left| Murat Direkçi || It's Showtime 2012 in Leeuwarden || Amsterdam, Netherlands ||  Decision (Majority) || 3 || 3:00 
|-  style="background:#cfc;" 
| 2011-09-24  || Win ||align=left| Artur Kyshenko || It's Showtime "Fast & Furious 70MAX" || Brussels, Belgium || KO (Left Hook)|| 1 || 2:20
|-  style="background:#cfc;"
! style=background:white colspan=9 |
|-  style="background:#cfc;"
| 2011-09-24  || Win ||align=left| Chris Ngimbi || It's Showtime "Fast & Furious 70MAX" || Brussels, Belgium || Decision (Majority) || 3 || 3:00 
|-
! style=background:white colspan=9 |
|-  style="background:#cfc;"
| 2011-09-24  || Win ||align=left| Chahid Oulad El Hadj || It's Showtime "Fast & Furious 70MAX" || Brussels, Belgium ||TKO (Corner stoppage) || 2 || 2:40 
|-
! style=background:white colspan=9 |
|-  style="background:#fbb;"
| 2011-05-21 || Loss  ||align=left| Mohamed Khamal || Fightclub presents: It's Showtime 2011 || Amsterdam, Netherlands || Decision (Split) || 3 || 3:00 
|-  style="background:#cfc;"
| 2011-03-19 || Win ||align=left| Davit Kiria || United Glory 13: 2010-2011 World Series Semifinals || Charleroi, Belgium || Decision (Unanimous) || 3 || 3:00 
|-  style="background:#cfc;"
| 2011-03-06 || Win ||align=left| Chahid Oulad El Hadj || Fightingstars presents: It's Showtime Sporthallen Zuid || Amsterdam, Netherlands || Decision (Majority) || 3 || 3:00 
|-  style="background:#cfc;"
| 2010-12-04 || Win ||align=left| Mikel Colaj || Janus Fight Night 2010 || Padua, Italy || Decision || 3 || 3:00 
|-  style="background:#cfc;"
| 2010-10-16 || Win ||align=left|  Maxim Vorovski || United Glory 12: 2010-2011 World Series Quarterfinals || Amsterdam, Netherlands || Decision (Unanimous) || 3 || 3:00 
|-  style="background:#cfc;"
| 2010-09-12 || Win ||align=left|  William Diender || Fightingstars presents: It's Showtime 2010 || Amsterdam, Netherlands || KO (Liver Punch) || 3 || 
|-  style="background:#fbb;"
| 2010-06-11 || Loss ||align=left|  Ajay Balgobind || Friday Night Fight Night || Amsterdam, Netherlands || Ext. R. Decision || 4 || 3:00 
|-  style="background:#fbb;"
| 2010-03-21 || Loss ||align=left|  Mohamed Khamal || K-1 World MAX 2010 West Europe Tournament, Semi Finals || Utrecht, Netherlands || KO ||  || 
|-  style="background:#cfc;"
| 2010-03-21 || Win ||align=left|  Henri van Opstal || K-1 World MAX 2010 West Europe Tournament, Quarter Finals || Utrecht, Netherlands || Ext. R. Decision || 4 || 3:00 
|-  style="background:#cfc;"
| 2010-02-27 || Win ||align=left|  Anthony Nekrui || Amsterdam Fight Club || Amsterdam, Netherlands || Decision || 3 || 3:00 
|-  style="background:#cfc;"
| 2009-12-12 || Win ||align=left|  Yassin Baitar || || Netherlands || Ext. R. Decision (split) || 3 || 3:00 
|-  style="background:#cfc;"
| 2009-10-24 || Win ||align=left|  Chad Bishop || This Is It! || Rhoon, Netherlands || TKO || || 
|-  style="background:#cfc;"
| 2009-09-27 || Win ||align=left|  Ait Said Houkari || Knock Out Combat 6 || Eindhoven, Netherlands || KO || 5 || 
|-  style="background:#cfc;"
| 2009-06-13 || Win ||align=left|  Achmed Zragua || Gentlemen Promotions || Tilburg, Netherlands || Decision (unanimous) || 3 || 3:00 
|-  style="background:#cfc;"
| 2008-12-17 || Win ||align=left|  Amin Choukoud ||  || Netherlands || Decision (split) || 5 || 3:00 
|-  style="background:#fbb;"
| 2008-08-01 || Loss ||align=left|  Youssef Boughanem ||  || Veghel, Netherlands ||  ||  || 
|-  style="background:#fbb;"
| 2008-05-24 || Loss ||align=left|  Robert Siebenheller || Fight Sensation 3 || Doetinchem, Netherlands || Decision || 3 || 2:00 
|-  style="background:#fbb;"
| 2008-05-24 || Loss ||align=left|  Samil Unal || Fight Sensation 3 || Doetinchem, Netherlands || Decision || 3 || 3:00 
|-  style="background:#fbb;"
| 2008-05-10 || Loss ||align=left|  Antoine Pinto || Golden Belt || Liverpool, England || Decision || 5 || 3:00 
|-  style="background:#cfc;"
| 2008-04-26 || Win ||align=left|  Hammadi el Mahdaoui || K-1 World GP 2008 Amsterdam, Super Fight || Amsterdam, Netherlands || Decision (Unanimous) || 3 || 3:00 
|-  style="background:#c5d2ea;"
| 2008-02-17 || Draw ||align=left|  Leroy Kaestner || K-1 MAX Netherlands 2008 The Final Qualification, Opening fight || Utrecht, Netherlands || Decision draw || 5 || 2:00 
|-  style="background:#cfc;"
| 2008-01-20 || Win ||align=left|  Faysal el Osrouti || Kickboksgala, Sportschool Jellema || Houten, Netherlands || Decision || 5 || 2:00 
|-  style="background:#cfc;"
| 2007-12-16 || Win ||align=left|  Arman Soufi || || Netherlands || Decision (split) || 5 || 2:00 
|-  style="background:#fbb;"
| 2007-11-24 || Loss ||align=left|  Jan Pruijmboom || Shootboxing in the Autotron || Rosmalen, Netherlands || Decision || 5 || 2:00 
|-  style="background:#cfc;"
| 2007-09-23 || Win ||align=left| Ruslan Mamedkhanov || Rings Holland: Risky Business, Vechtsebanen || Utrecht, Netherlands || KO (Right hook) || 1 || 
|-  style="background:#fbb;"
| 2007-07-01 || Loss ||align=left|  Anthony Kane || Next Generation Warriors || Utrecht, Netherlands || Decision || 5 || 2:00 
|-  style="background:#fbb;"
| 2007-05-13 || Loss ||align=left|  Jan Pruijmboom || Fight Night Veghel || Veghel, Netherlands || Decision || 5 || 2:00 
|-  style="background:#cfc;"
| 2007-04-09 || Win ||align=left|  Robert Siebenheller || || Netherlands || Decision || 5 || 2:00 
|-  style="background:#cfc;"
| 2007-03-18 || Win ||align=left|  Soufiane Aouragh || Demolition Part II || Den Bosch, Netherlands || Decision (majority) || 5 || 2:00 
|-  style="background:#cfc;"
| 2007-02-17 || Win ||align=left| Faysal el Ousrouti || Valentijn's Event || Utrecht, Netherlands || Decision (Unanimous) || 5  || 2:00 
|-  style="background:#cfc;"
| 2007-01-22 || Win ||align=left| Yavuz Kayabasi || MT Lumpini & Siam Gym Gala|| Weert, Netherlands || Decision (Unanimous) || 3  || 2:00 
|-  style="background:#cfc;"
| 2006-11-18 || Win ||align=left| Zeki Bouzreki || Muay thai gala Vlaardingen || Vlaardingen, Netherlands || TKO ||  || 
|-  style="background:#fbb;"
| 2006-10-01 || Loss ||align=left| Edson Fortes || Thaiboks Gala, Schuttersveld|| Rotterdam, Netherlands || Decision (Unanimous) || 3 || 2:00 
|-  style="background:#cfc;"
| 2006-09-10 || Win ||align=left| Romano Morjoner || Thaiboks Gala Veghel || Veghel, Netherlands || TKO (Doctor stoppage) || || 
|-  style="background:#c5d2ea;"
| 2006-06-25 || Draw ||align=left| Harry Petalo || Thaibox Gala || Bergen op Zoom, Netherlands || Decision draw || 3 || 2:00 
|-  style="background:#cfc;"
| 2006-06-04 || Win ||align=left|  Chafik Ayoub || Kickbox Gala Druten || Druten, Netherlands || Decision (split) || 3 || 2:00 
|-  style="background:#cfc;"
| 2006-05-07 || Win ||align=left| Arwien Ramlal || Muay Thai gala Den Bosch || Den Bosch, Netherlands || Decision (Unanimous) || 3 || 2:00 
|-  style="background:#fbb;"
| 2006-04-15 || Loss ||align=left| Sergio Menig || Al-Fid Thaibox Gala|| Eindhoven, Netherlands || Decision (Unanimous) || 3 || 2:00 
|-  style="background:#cfc;"
| 2006-03-11 || Win ||align=left|  Massi Rahimi || || Netherlands || Decision || 3 || 2:00 
|-  style="background:#cfc;"
| 2006-02-05 || Win ||align=left|  Atty Gol || Muaythai Gala Fight and Survive || Den Bosch, Netherlands || Decision || 3 || 2:00 
|-  style="background:#fbb;"
| 2005-11-26 || Loss ||align=left|  Romano Morjoner || Muay Thai gala Hoogwoud || Hoogwoud, Netherlands || Decision || 3 || 2:00 
|-  style="background:#c5d2ea;"
| 2005-10-09 || Draw ||align=left|  Jeffrey Ezinga || Muay Thai gala Den Bosch || Den Bosch, Netherlands || Decision || 3 || 2:00 
|-  style="background:#cfc;"
| 2005-01-23 || Win ||align=left|  Achmed || || Netherlands || Decision (split) || 3 || 1:00 
|-  style="background:#cfc;"
| 2004-12-18 || Win ||align=left| Sofiane S.S. Emmen || Muaythai Gala Akdeniz Gym || Deventer, Netherlands || TKO (Corner stoppage) || 2 || 
|-  style="background:#cfc;"
| 2004-11-13 || Win ||align=left|  Gussen Amirov || Sportlife Thaiboxing Gala || Heerlen, Netherlands || Decision (split) || 3 || 1:00 
|-
| colspan=9 | Legend:

See also
 List of K-1 events
 List of It's Showtime events
 List of male kickboxers

References

External links
 
 

1989 births
Living people
Dutch male kickboxers
Dutch Muay Thai practitioners
Dutch male mixed martial artists
Mixed martial artists utilizing Muay Thai
Mixed martial artists utilizing shootboxing
Mixed martial artists utilizing wrestling
Mixed martial artists utilizing judo
Dutch male judoka
Featherweight kickboxers
Lightweight kickboxers
Welterweight kickboxers
Glory kickboxers
Bellator male fighters
Sportspeople from 's-Hertogenbosch